Fundação de Apoio ao Desenvolvimento Educacional de Montes Claros (FUNADEM) was a Brazilian professional men's volleyball team from Montes Claros, Minas Gerais. It was nicknamed by the press and supporters to

The team competed in the Brazilian Superleague with the names Montes Claros/FUNADEM or BMG/Montes Claros between the seasons 2009–2010 and 2011–2012. It was dissolved afterwards due to lack of sponsorship. The best result was in the team's initial season, when they were runners-up.

Honours 

 Brazilian Superleague
 Runners-up: 2009–10 
 Minas Gerais state championship:
 Champions: 2009

References 

Brazilian volleyball clubs
Volleyball clubs established in 2009
Volleyball clubs in Minas Gerais (state)